The Sultanate of Asahan was a Malay sultanate from approximately 1630 AD until 1946 AD. It was located in the north-east of the island of Sumatra, in what is now Indonesia and covered what is now the Asahan Regency.

History 
The sultanate was founded around 1630 by Rajah Abdul Jalil, the son of Sultan Iskandar Muda of Aceh. Asahan remained indebted to Aceh until the beginning of the 19th century. After this, it declared itself independent under Sultan Muhammad Husain Rahmad Shah. During his 46-year rule, more and more trade was conducted with Europeans and this led to an agreement with the government of the Dutch East Indies.

At his death in 1859, there were difficulties with the succession. The successors had problems with the Dutch authority in Batavia and this led to the relocation of the capital to the interior of the country. The Dutch intervened several times in the succession of the Sultans. The last ruler was Sultan Shaibun Abdul Jalil Rahmad Shah who succeeded his father in 1915. At the end of the Second World War, the sultanate was not restored to its former glory but incorporated into the new republic of Indonesia.

Socio-cultural
As an empire under the influence of Islamic culture, then in Asahan also developed a pretty good religious life. In fact, there is a famous scholar born from Asahan, namely Abdul Hamid. He was born in 1880 (1298 H), and died on 18 February 1951 (10 Rabiul Awal 1370 H). Datuk, his grandmother and father came from Talu, Minangkabau. Sheikh Abdul Hamid studied religion in Mecca, therefore, he was highly respected by the scholars of that era.

In its development, it was the students of Sheikh Abdul Hamid who later founded the Jamiyyatul Washliyyah organization. An organization based on Sunni schools and Syafi'i schools. In many ways, this organization has similarities with the Tarbiyah Islamiyah Association (PERTI) which was founded by Minangkabau scholars. The existence of many of these similarities, because indeed the scholars were friendly to each other since they studied in Mecca. The views of these religious leaders are very different from the reformist ideas brought by young Minangkabau scholars, such as Dr. Haji Abdul Karim Amrullah. Therefore, there is often a polemic between the followers of these two different understandings.

In the first half of the 20th century, around 1916, a school called Madrasah Ulumul Arabiyyah was founded in Asahan. As the first director, Sheikh Abdul Hamid was appointed. In its journey, the Ulumul Arabiyah madrasa later developed into one of the important centers of Islamic education in Asahan, even including the well-known madrasah (madrasa) in North Sumatra, comparable to the Stabat, Langkat Islamic Madrasa, Madrasah Islam Binjai and Madrasah al-Hasaniyah Medan. Among the well-known scholars graduating from this Asahan school was Sheikh Muhammad Arsyad Thalib Lubis (1908-1972).

See also

 Sultanate of Deli
 Sultanate of Langkat
 Sultanate of Serdang
 Sultanate of Siak Sri Indrapura
 Sultanate of Bulungan
 Jambi Sultanate
 Palembang Sultanate
 Riau-Lingga Sultanate
 Kingdom of Kaimana

References

History of Sumatra
Former sultanates
Precolonial states of Indonesia
North Sumatra
Islamic states in Indonesia